Martic can refer to:
 Martic Township, Lancaster County, Pennsylvania

It can also be an anglicized version of the Serbian and Croatian surname Martić